The 2009 Hamilton 400 was the second race meeting of the 2009 V8 Supercar Championship Series. It was held on the weekend of 17–19 April around the inner city streets of Hamilton, in New Zealand. The 2009 Hamilton 400 was the second running of the event.

Rule change
The qualifying procedure was changed with a qualifying session to be held for each of the two races, instead of one session for both races.

Race 3

Qualifying
Qualifying was held on Saturday 18 April, and was split into two sessions and followed with a top ten shootout. Jamie Whincup was fastest in qualifying for Team Vodafone but Mark Winterbottom secured his ninth pole position by just seven 10,000ths of a second. Steven Johnson and Michael Caruso produced unexpectedly good lap to qualify on the second row, particular for Caruso to be the top Holden on the grid.

Race
Jason Bright changed his engine after qualifying and stalled on dummy grid. Fiore and D'Alberto started from the pitlane. Caruso was slow away from the second row as Winterbottom stormed away from Whincup, Johnson, Tander, Holdsworth, Lowndes and Courtney. Whincup dived into the lead at turn 6 to lead the opening lap. D'Alberto crashed on the third lap at turn 7. D'Alberto restarts but the following lap Murphy and Slade, separately, crashed at the same point. Murphy was out with bent steering. A safety car was called for D'Alberto's car prior to the Nash Commodore restarting.

Perkins spun at the restart trying to avoid Dumbrell. Dumbrell had a spin a lap later, tangling with Van Gisbergen. Pitstops began around lap 20, beginning with Jason Bright. Craig Lowndes was an early stopper. James Courtney and Fabian Coulthard were big climbers through the field before Courtney stopped early on lap 24. Tander stalled in his pitstop and was passed by four cars as he exited.

Lowndes brushed the wall at turn 7 on lap 37, causing him to pit into the garage for mechanical work and rejoined losing some laps. Marcus Marshall also had an engine fail late in the running after clobbering a tyre bundle on the back chicane. Fiore retired after a clash with Cameron McConville, while Ingall slowed in late lap with mechanical problems. A shambolic safety car restart that saw faster cars mixed up with the mechanically wounded cars of Ingall and Caruso caused Courtney to hit the back of Tander's Commodore, slowing both cars in the later laps.

Whincup stormed away at the final restart to win from Winterbottom with Lee Holdsworth continuing his early season good form to finish third ahead of the consistent Steven Johnson

Race 4
Race 4 was held on Sunday 19 April.

Qualifying
The new format for Sunday qualifying made its debut, a return to traditional qualifying methods with all cars on the track together. The session was red flagged late in the session with many of the faster runners caught out just warming up for their final runs at pole after Tim Slade crashed. Steven Johnson was fastest at the time, securing only his second pole position, his previous, Canberra in 2001, also a street circuit. Team mate James Courtney started alongside as Ford dominated the timesheet occupying eight of the top ten position with the only Holdens the garry Rogers Motorsport duo of Michael Caruso and Lee Holdsworth occupying the third row of the grid behind Steven Richards and Jamie Whincup.

Race
Dean Fiore started from pitlane while Tim Slade's car was too heavily damaged to continue. Johnson ran away from the start to lead while Steven Richards jumped past James Courtney for second as the safety car came out to attend a collision between Mark Winterbottom and the wall. Todd Kelly, being pressured by Jason Bargwanna, then struck Winterbottom. Kelly limped back to the pits while Winterbottom was stranded on the track with broken steering.

Whincup, unable to make progress against Johnson, Richards and Courtney, pitted early to try to get clear air, but it was a slow stop. Johnson slow built up a lead with Courtney moving into second on lap 22. Richards, suffering rear tyre problems, soon succumbed to Holdsworth and Caruso.

By lap 24 leading cars were pitting in numbers. Johnson pitted on lap 26 from the lead. Johnson rejoined behind Whincup but ahead of Holdsworth. Caruso pitted from second on lap 28, stalling briefly, rejoining behind Lowndes and Richards, just ahead of Coulthard. Coulthard claimed a position up the back straight from Caruso. Todd Kelly crashed the wall with steering, already repaired once.

Courtney finally pitted from the lead on lap 32, rejoining behind Whincup, in front of Johnson and Holdsworth. Richards was now holding fifth ahead of Lowndes and Coulthard. Richards spun off track on lap 46, dumping a number of positions. Two laps later Shane van Gisbergen took Rick Kelly off track with an overtaking move gone wrong at the hairpin. Both recovered. Lowndes broke the front left corner of the car, leaving suspension and wheel deranged after clipping the tyre bundle at the back straight chicane. Ingall pulled into the pits trailing smoke with just two laps to go.

Whincup cleared out to win from the Dick Johnson Racing pair of Courtney and Johnson with Holdsworth's fourth position vaulting him past Will Davison into second place in the championship pointscore.

Results

Qualifying Race 3

Race 3

Qualifying Race 4

Standings
 After Round 2 of 14

References

External links
Hamilton 400 website
Official timing and results

Hamilton
Hamilton 400
Ham
April 2009 sports events in New Zealand